Wayne County is a county located in the U.S. state of Illinois. According to the 2010 census, it had a population of 16,760. Its county seat is Fairfield. It is located in the southern portion of Illinois known locally as "Little Egypt".

History
Wayne County was formed in 1819 out of Edwards County. It is named after Gen. "Mad Anthony" Wayne, an officer in the Revolutionary War and Northwest Indian War.

Geography

Climate and weather

Major highways
  Interstate 64
  U.S. Highway 45
  Illinois Route 15
  Illinois Route 242

Adjacent counties
 Clay County (north)
 Richland County (northeast)
 Edwards County (east)
 White County (southeast)
 Hamilton County (south)
 Jefferson County (southwest)
 Marion County (northwest)

Demographics

As of the 2010 United States Census, there were 16,760 people, 7,102 households, and 4,853 families living in the county. The racial makeup of the county was 98.0% white, 0.4% Asian, 0.3% black or African American, 0.2% American Indian, 0.3% from other races, and 0.8% from two or more races. Those of Hispanic or Latino origin made up 1.1% of the population. In terms of ancestry, 17.0% were German, 14.1% were English, 12.7% were American, and 9.8% were Irish.

Of the 7,102 households, 28.7% had children under the age of 18 living with them, 55.1% were married couples living together, 9.1% had a female householder with no husband present, 31.7% were non-families, and 28.4% of all households were made up of individuals. The average household size was 2.35 and the average family size was 2.86. The median age was 42.9 years.

The median income for a household in the county was $39,207 and the median income for a family was $47,879. Males had a median income of $34,800 versus $27,192 for females. The per capita income for the county was $21,493. About 9.9% of families and 14.3% of the population were below the poverty line, including 18.0% of those under age 18 and 13.8% of those age 65 or over.

Communities

City
 Fairfield

Villages

 Cisne
 Golden Gate
 Jeffersonville
 Johnsonville
 Keenes
 Mount Erie
 Sims
 Wayne City

Unincorporated communities

 Barnhill
 Ellery
 Mayberry
 Rinard
 Wynoose
 Zenith

Townships
Wayne County is divided into these 20 townships:

 Arrington
 Barnhill
 Bedford
 Berry
 Big Mound
 Elm River
 Four Mile
 Garden Hill
 Grover
 Hickory Hill
 Indian Prairie
 Jasper
 Keith
 Lamard
 Leech
 Massilon
 Mount Erie
 Orchard
 Orel
 Zif

Program 1033 Acquisitions
According to Department of Defense data, Wayne County has received six 5.56MM rifles and three "Utility Trucks" with a total acquisition cost of $120,705.

Politics

See also
 National Register of Historic Places listings in Wayne County

References

 
Illinois counties
1819 establishments in Illinois
Populated places established in 1819
Wayne County, Illinois